Ian McDougall (24 May 1935 – 10 November 2018) was an Australian geologist and geochemist.

McDougall was born in Hobart and studied at the University of Tasmania and Australian National University, before taking up a research position at ANU. He was a Fellow of the Geological Society of America, the Australian Academy of Science, and the American Geophysical Union. McDougall also served as Vice President of the International Association of Volcanology and Chemistry of the Earth's Interior.

McDougall's research areas included plate tectonics and geochronology. He has been described as "one of Australia's most internationally distinguished earth scientists," and was awarded the Centenary Medal in 2001.

McDougall died on 10 November 2018.

References

1935 births
People from Hobart
2018 deaths
Australian geochemists
University of Tasmania alumni
Australian National University alumni
Fellows of the Australian Academy of Science
Recipients of the Centenary Medal
Fellows of the Geological Society of America
Fellows of the American Geophysical Union